Becker is an unincorporated community in Nassau County, Florida, United States. It is located on U.S. Route 17, north of Yulee in the north-central area of the county.

Geography

References

Unincorporated communities in Nassau County, Florida
Unincorporated communities in the Jacksonville metropolitan area
Unincorporated communities in Florida